Ford Whitman Harris (August 8, 1877 – October 27, 1962)  was an American production engineer who derived the square-root formula for ordering inventory now known as the economic order quantity, which has appeared in countless academic articles and texts over the past 100 years.

Born in 1877 and having grown up in Portland, after finishing high school he worked for four years as an engineering apprentice and draftsman for Belknap Motor Company and Maine Electric Company. In 1900 he moved to Pittsburgh where he became a draftsman and engineer for Heyl and Patterson. From 1904 to 1912 Harris worked for Westinghouse Electric and Manufacturing Company. Ford W. Harris married Eugenia Mellon.

Harris was also a self-taught attorney, and was the first president of the Los Angeles Intellectual Property Law Association. (https://www.laipla.net/past-presidents/)

See also
Thomson M. Whitin
Harvey M. Wagner
Economic order quantity

Published works
How many parts to make at once, Factory, The Magazine of Management 1913
How much stock to keep at hand, Factory, The Magazine of Management 1913
Patents from a Patent Attorney's viewpoint, Machinery 1914
What quantity to make at once, The Library of Factory Management 1915
Inventions, patents, and the engineer, Electr. Eng. 1943

References

Engineers from Pennsylvania
People from Portland, Maine
People from Pittsburgh
1877 births
1962 deaths
Engineers from Maine
American patent attorneys